Mildred Dein (born Mildred Gilrod) was an American screenwriter who worked primarily on genre films during 1950s.

Biography 
Born in New York to Jewish immigrants from Russia and Germany, she married writer-director Edward Dein in Los Angeles in 1934, and the pair would go on to collaborate on half a dozen films over the next 20 years. The pair also wrote books like 1947's The Pencil Is Sharp together. For years, they resided in a castle-like home in Los Angeles's Laurel Canyon.

Selected filmography 

 Curse of the Undead (1959)
 Seven Guns to Mesa (1958)
 Calypso Joe (1957)
 Shack Out on 101 (1955)
 The Heart and the Sword (1953)
 Come Die My Love (1952)

References 

American women screenwriters
Screenwriters from New York (state)
1911 births
1997 deaths
20th-century American women writers
20th-century American screenwriters